is a Japanese non-ferrous metal manufacturing company based in Amagasaki, Hyōgo Prefecture, Japan. It is the world's second largest producer of titanium sponge after VSMPO-Avisma.

It produces titanium products using the Kroll process, and also produces silicon products.

In 2010, increased demand for titanium led to increased supply capacity, but Osaka Titanium Technologies was still able to raise prices due to continuing strong demand from the aviation industry.

The company is part of the Sumitomo Group, one of the largest Japanese keiretsu.

History
The company was founded in 1937 as Osaka Special Steel Manufacturing. Sumitomo Metal Industries took a stake in 1952, and work began on titanium. Also in 1952, the company changed its name to Osaka Titanium Co., Ltd. Kobe Steel took an equity stake in the company in 1953.

In 2002, the company was named Sumitomo Titanium Corporation and was listed on the first section of Tokyo Stock Exchange, and in 2007, it was renamed Osaka Titanium Technologies.

Business segments and products 
 Titanium
 Titanium sponge
 Titanium ingot
 Titanium tetrachloride and titanium tetrachloride aqueous solution
 Ferro-titanium
 Polycrystalline Silicon
 High-performance Materials
 High-purity titanium
 Silicon monoxide
 TILOP (Gas-atomized titanium powder)
 Titanium powder
 Photocatalysts

References

External links
 Official website 
 Osaka Titanium Technologies on Google Finance
 FT.com profile

Metal companies of Japan
Titanium companies of Japan
Companies based in Hyōgo Prefecture
Companies listed on the Tokyo Stock Exchange
Technology companies established in 1952
Sumitomo Group
Japanese companies established in 1952